George Butt may refer to:
 George Butt (priest)
 George Butt (politician)